Naeimeh Eshraghi (Persian: نعیمه اشراقی) (born 1965) is an Iranian politician who is from the family of Ayatollah Khomeini.

Naeimeh Eshraghi was born  from Shahab-al-din Eshraghi and Sedigheh Khomeini, and is the granddaughter of Ayatollah Khomeini. She studied a Bachelor of Science in Petrochemical engineering and a master's degree in industrial engineering in Amirkabir University of Technology. She has been on the board of Kish oil engineering company. She has been married to Seyyed Mohammad hassan Taheri, the son of Ayatollah Taheri Esfahani.

Controversies
In 2013, Eshraghi  made headlines again when she posted a joke on her Facebook in which she said that she often joked with Ayatollah Khomeini that "Pasdaran (revolutionary guards) should marry widows of the martyrs, and Khomeini wished that he was a Pasdar himself". This comment made angry responses from the families of Iran–Iraq War veterans and the son of Mohammad Ebrahim Hemmat wrote a harsh letter condemning her. She later said that her Facebook page was hacked. The Iranian parliament later issued a statement saying that her comments will be investigated. She later closed down her Facebook page because of the mounting criticism.

References

External links
 Naeimeh Eshraghi official page on Instagram

1965 births
Living people
Amirkabir University of Technology alumni
Iranian engineers
Iranian politicians
Iranian reformists